Seth Nana Ofori-Twumasi (born 15 May 1990) is an English professional footballer who plays as a defender or midfielder for Peterborough  & District League side Oakham United.

Early life
Twumasi was born in Accra, Ghana and moved to England at the age of nine. He grew up on the same housing estate in West London as Carlton Cole.

Club career

Chelsea
Twumasi started his career as a Chelsea Youth Team player, eventually becoming captain. Twumasi signed his first professional contract with Chelsea in 2007

It was announced on 13 November 2009, that Twumasi had joined League Two club Dagenham & Redbridge on a one-month loan deal. He made his Football League debut on 14 November for Dagenham & Redbridge in their 1–0 away victory against Accrington Stanley. His loan was extended on 17 December, until 9 January 2010.

Peterborough United
Twumasi signed for League One club Peterborough United on a three-year contract on 1 July 2010. He signed from Chelsea on a free transfer.

Northampton Town
Since signing for the team he was a regular member of the first team squad but at the beginning of 2011–12 season he ruptured a cruciate knee ligament in a 3–0 win against AFC Wimbledon and subsequently missed the rest of the season. He has since undergone knee reconstruction surgery. Twumasi was released at the end of the 2012–13 season by Northampton.

Yeovil Town
On 30 July 2013, Twumasi signed for Football League Championship side Yeovil Town.

Twumasi was released by Yeovil at the end of the 2014–15 season following their relegation to League Two.

Newport County
On 25 June 2015, Twumasi signed for League Two club Newport County. He made his competitive debut for Newport on 11 August, versus Wolverhampton Wanderers in the Football League Cup first round. Twumasi made his league debut for Newport in the League Two match versus Stevenage on 15 August 2015. He was released by Newport on 10 May 2016 at the end of his contract.

Maidstone United
Twumasi made what he thought was a one-off appearance for Maidstone United against Bromley in the Kent Senior Cup in September 2016. However, a recent rule change meant that by playing for the Stones, he rendered himself unable to move to a Football League club until the transfer window opened in January 2017, scuppering a proposed move to Cheltenham Town. Twumasi subsequently decided to stay with part-time Maidstone in non league's top tier, the National League, while also setting up a football academy in his home country Ghana.

After making a number of impressive appearances for the club, Stones manager Jay Saunders revealed in late December 2016 that he did not expect the player to turn out for Maidstone again, citing that he still had Football League interest and was also busy setting up his academy. However, in early January 2017, Saunders declared that he expected Twumasi to now remain with the club.

Maidenhead United
Twumasi joined Maidenhead United on a permanent deal on 17 November 2018.

Dover Athletic
On 25 June 2021, Twumasi joined fellow National League side Dover Athletic following three seasons at Maidenhead. Following relegation, Twumasi left the club after one season.

International career
Twumasi is eligible to represent either Ghana, where he was born, or England, where he grew up from the age of nine. He represented England at under-16, under-17, under-18 and under-20 levels. He played at the 2007 FIFA U-17 World Cup, 2007 UEFA European Under-17 Championship and 2009 FIFA U-20 World Cup. Before a match between England under-20s and their Ghanaian counterparts in the U-20 World Cup in 2009, Twumasi stated he has no doubts over his allegiance, saying: "The game will be emotional, but I'm English now and that's who I want to play for, so there will be no love lost between us."

Personal life
Twumasi founded the Mirage Football Academy in Ghana.

Career statistics

References

External links

Living people
1990 births
Footballers from Accra
English footballers
Ghanaian footballers
Chelsea F.C. players
Dagenham & Redbridge F.C. players
Peterborough United F.C. players
Northampton Town F.C. players
Yeovil Town F.C. players
Newport County A.F.C. players
Maidstone United F.C. players
Maidenhead United F.C. players
Dover Athletic F.C. players
English Football League players
National League (English football) players
England youth international footballers
Association football defenders
Footballers from Greater London
Ghanaian emigrants to England